Francisco "Paco" Delgado López is a Spanish costume designer from Lanzarote, Canary Islands. He is best known for his nominations for the Academy Awards in the category of Best Costume Design twice: at the 85th Academy Awards for the film Les Misérables, and at the 88th Academy Awards for the film The Danish Girl.

He has also won two Goya Awards.

Selected filmography

References

External links

Spanish costume designers
Living people
Year of birth missing (living people)
Goya Award winners
People from Lanzarote